ICCREA Group known formerly as Istituto Centrale delle Casse Rurali ed Artigiane, is a central institution of Italian credit unions and rural savings banks. The holding company of the group was ICCREA Holding (from 1995 to 2016), while ICCREA Banca, ICCREA BancaImpresa and several companies were subsidiaries. However, ICCREA Banca revered merger with ICCREA Holding in mid-2016, as part of the banking reform of Italy. The co-operative banks of Italy would create strong central banks (Cassa Centrale Banca had also applied to be another central bank) with power to recapitalize individual co-operative bank.

Shareholders

The share capital was represented by 21,954,905 ordinary shares with a par value of €51.65 each with a total value of €1,133,970,843.55
 Federazione Italiana delle Banche di Credito Cooperativo - Casse Rurali ed Artigiane (Federcasse)
 15 regional credit union federations
 Federazione BCC Emilia Romagna (0.12%)
 Cassa Centrale Banca - Credito Cooperativo del Nord Est (2.82%)
 Cassa Centrale Raiffeisen dell'Alto Adige (1.11%)
 328 credit unions (BCC) and rural saving banks
Banca di Credito Cooperativo di Roma (3.60%)
 Credito Cooperativo Ravennate e Imolese (2.0019%)
 Banca di Credito Cooperativo di Pompiano e della Franciacorta (1.64%)
 Banca di Viterbo Credito Cooperativo (0.0104%)
 Banca d'Alba
 Banca di Cambiano
 Cassa Padana (1.35%)
 ChiantiBanca
 3 ex-BCC
 Others (Fondo Sviluppo e Banca Sviluppo)
 Treasury shares (0.04%)

See also

 Crédit Agricole S.A., French counterpart
 Raiffeisen Bank International, Austrian counterpart

References

External links
  
  

Cooperative banks of Italy
Banks established in 1963
1963 establishments in Italy
Companies based in Rome
Banks under direct supervision of the European Central Bank